The  was a Japanese clan which served the Kamakura shogunate as local officials on Tsushima. It is believed the clan may have been derived from the Taira clan, but the validity of this notion is not fully evident from primary sources.

In 1246, the Abiru rose up against their superiors, the Dazaifu authorities, headed by the Chinzei Bugyō, which oversaw the governance of Kyūshū for the shogunate. Koremune Shigehisa, at the request of Dazaifu, put down the rebellion and put an end to the Abiru clan.

References
"宗　氏." 戦国武将出自事典。Harimaya.com. Accessed 29 Sept 2007.

Japanese clans